The Battle of Fengwudong was a battle between Korean independence militias and Japanese forces in Manchuria and was one of the earliest domestic support operations of the Korean independence forces. From 6  to 7 June 1920, a confrontation occurred between a Korean independence militia of 1,300 under the command of Hong Beom-do (홍범도, 洪範圖) and Choi Chin-dong (최진동, 崔振東) and a Japanese suppression battalion consisting of 500 troops. It occurred during the campaign of the Japanese army in Jiandao, during the Japanese occupation of Korea.

Notes

See also
Memorial Day

19th Division

Cultural references
2019 The Battle: Roar to Victory (Korean Film)

Bibliography
JACAR Ref.C03022770200, Chōsengun Shireibu (朝鮮軍司令部): Kantō shuppeishi (間島出兵史)
Sasaki Harutaka (佐々木春隆): Kankoku dokuritsu undōshi jō no "Seizanri taisen" kō (韓国独立運動史上の「青山里大戦」考), Gunji shigaku (軍事史学), Vol.15 No. 3, pp. 22–34, 1979.
Sasaki Harutaka (佐々木春隆): Chōsen sensō zenshi to shite no Kankoku dokuritsu undō no kenkyū (朝鮮戦争前史としての韓国独立運動の研究), 1985.
 윤병석, 《간도역사의 연구》(국학자료원, 2006)
 박은봉, 《한국사 100 장면》 (가람기획, 1993)

Korean independence movement
Battles involving Japan
Battles involving Korea
History of Jilin
Conflicts in 1920
1920 in Japan
1920 in Korea
June 1920 events